"Put Your Head on My Shoulders" is the seventh episode in the second season of the American animated television series Futurama. It originally aired on the Fox network in the United States on February 13, 2000. The episode was written by Ken Keeler and directed by Chris Louden. The episode focuses on a romantic relationship between Fry and Amy.

Plot
Amy buys a car at Malfunctioning Eddie's Rocket-car Emporium, and Fry joins her on a road trip to Mercury that leads to a long wait for a tow truck after they run out of gas. Then, she and Fry begin a romantic relationship after having sex on the return trip. Meanwhile, Bender refuses to get the recommended safety features installed on his rear end and is warned that it could explode at any time.

With Valentine's Day approaching, Bender decides to start a computer dating service. Fry worries that his new relationship with Amy is becoming too serious, so he asks Leela to come with them on a picnic to Europa they had planned. When she refuses, Fry asks Dr. Zoidberg to come with them. Zoidberg joins them, but when Fry asks him to drive, he accidentally pulls the wheel off, crashing the car. Fry wakes up to find Zoidberg telling him that his body was badly damaged in the crash. Fry, in shock, discovers his head was grafted onto Amy's shoulder in order to be kept alive. After returning to Earth, Fry breaks up with an unwilling Amy, and she makes Valentine's Day plans with another man.

Fry, Amy, and Amy's date wind up at the restaurant Elzar's, where all the people who applied to Bender's dating service—including Leela—are with their dates. All these dates are flops, however; Bender merely rounded up a bunch of strangers from the bus station, and they all leave for the bus ride home. Amy hits it off with her date, and she is about to leave with him—and Fry's unwilling head. Luckily for Fry, Leela spots him across the room and comes over to save him. Leela tricks Amy's boyfriend into talking about his job in bank regulation, and he soon winds up talking very boringly, distracting him from leaving with Amy. Fry quietly thanks Leela for the assistance.

The next day, Zoidberg reattaches Fry's head to his now-repaired body, and everything returns to normal. Some of the nerves in Fry's neck were apparently rewired so that Fry's left leg hits him every time he touches his neck. As a result, Fry accidentally kicks Bender, and the robot's rear end explodes.

Reception 
The A.V. Club gave the episode a B.

References

External links

 
Put Your Head on My Shoulder at The Infosphere.

Futurama (season 2) episodes
2000 American television episodes
Valentine's Day television episodes
Fiction set on Mercury (planet)
Television episodes written by Ken Keeler

fr:La Tête sur l'épaule